The Apollo  Racer GT is a Hungarian ultralight trike, designed and produced by Apollo Ultralight Aircraft of Eger. The aircraft is supplied as a kit for amateur construction or as a complete ready-to-fly-aircraft.

Design and development
The Racer GT is a simplified and lighter derivative of the Apollo Jet Star, with a simplified cockpit fairing and no engine cowling. It was designed to comply with the Fédération Aéronautique Internationale microlight category. It features a cable-braced hang glider-style high-wing, weight-shift controls, a two-seats-in-tandem, open cockpit, tricycle landing gear with wheel pants and a single engine in pusher configuration. The main landing gear uses strut-type suspension, rather than the leaf-type suspension used on the Apollo Delta Jet series. A nose wheel brake is standard equipment.

The aircraft is made from bolted-together aluminum tubing, with its double surface wing covered in Dacron sailcloth. The aircraft uses an "A" frame weight-shift control bar. The powerplant options include the twin cylinder, liquid-cooled, two-stroke, dual-ignition  Rotax 582 engine and the four cylinder, air and liquid-cooled, four-stroke, dual-ignition  Rotax 912 engine.

A number of different Apollo wings can be fitted to the basic carriage, including the C-15, C-15TN, C-17 and CXMD. Te Racer GT is the only aircraft built by Apollo that is approved to be fitted with floats. Optional equipment includes instructor training pedals, a hang glider towing system, ballistic parachute, windshield and main wheel  brakes .

Specifications (Racer GT)

References

External links

2000s Hungarian sport aircraft
2000s Hungarian ultralight aircraft
Light-sport aircraft
Single-engined pusher aircraft
Ultralight trikes
Apollo Ultralight Aircraft aircraft